Jabez Huntington may refer to:

 Jabez W. Huntington (1788–1847), United States Representative and Senator from Connecticut
 Jabez Huntington (colonist) (1719–1786), merchant and politician from Connecticut Colony